Shahrokhabad (also Romanized as Shāhrokhābād) is a village in Zangiabad Rural District, in the Central District of Kerman County, Kerman Province, Iran. At the 2006 census, its population was 1,549, in 400 families.

References 

Populated places in Kerman County